"Starships" is a song by rapper Nicki Minaj from her second studio album Pink Friday: Roman Reloaded (2012). It was released on February 14, 2012, by Young Money, Cash Money, and Universal Republic as the lead single from the album. The song was written by Minaj, Nadir Khayat, Carl Falk, Rami Yacoub, Bilal Hajji, and Wayne Hector, and it was produced by RedOne, Yacoub, and Falk.

"Starships" peaked inside the top five in fifteen countries. It debuted at number nine on the U.S. Billboard Hot 100, spent a total of 21 consecutive weeks in the top ten and peaked at number five, breaking a chart record at the time. The song has sold 4.5 million digital downloads in the U.S. as of 2014 and has been certified six times platinum by the RIAA, becoming her second-highest certified solo single in the U.S. The song is among the best-selling singles of all time worldwide, with 7.2 million copies sold, as of December 2012.

The corresponding music video was shot on Oahu Island, Hawaii. Directed by Anthony Mandler, the video features Minaj on a beach in a bikini, and near the end of the video, it shows her at a party, dancing to the song. The music video was well received by music critics, many praising the kaleidoscopic effects in the video and the carefree atmosphere. The music video won Best Female Video at the 2012 MTV Video Music Awards. The song was included in the 2012 video game Dance Central 3 and it is included in the best-selling video game Just Dance 2014. It is also one of the select few songs available on Just Dance 2014s demo version.

Minaj has performed the song live in a number of appearances, and it was the encore performance on the Pink Friday: Reloaded Tour. In September 2013, electronic artist Clive Tanaka filed suit against Minaj and the writers of the song, claiming it infringed on his own composition and recording "Neu Chicago", but the lawsuit was dismissed. Minaj later voiced regret over releasing the song.

Production
Nicki Minaj co-wrote "Starships" with its producers Nadir "RedOne" Khayat, Carl Falk, and Rami Yacoub, with additional writing from Wayne Hector and Bilal "The Chef" Hajji. In 2011, a demo version of "Starships", sung by Mohombi, was given to Minaj who personalized the verses to make it sound "more her style", while keeping the chorus. Minaj's vocals were recorded at Conway Studios in Los Angeles. Trevor Muzzy described the vocal recording process:

The song was mixed in only a day, and Muzzy went to Conway to see what minor adjustments Minaj wanted to do to the mix.

Composition

"Starships" is a dance-pop and techno-pop song that features Minaj rapping in the first verse, after the song opens with an electric guitar. According to MTV, the song shows Minaj's "pop side". During the final breakdown, a stadium football chant can be heard chanting the lead notes of the song. The background vocals on the chorus were considered extremely similar to Britney Spears' 2011 single "Till the World Ends" by Scott Schettler of Popcrush. Jocelyn Vena of MTV also said that "it's hard not to see Spears' influence on the rapper/singer when listening to the song." Billboard compared "Starships" to the work of Lady Gaga and Jennifer Lopez, other artists produced by RedOne. Musically, "Starships" is written in the key of D major and follows a moderate tempo of 125 beats per minute. Written in common time, the song follows a chord progression of D−A−G−Bm−Fm−G. The song contains a brief sample of "Twinkle Twinkle Little Star" as written by Jane Taylor. Hector and Mohambi provide backing vocals during the final chorus.

Critical reception
The Los Angeles Times wrote that "The new single will undoubtedly divide Minaj's fan base. Longtime fans may want the cypher queen they fell in love with when she was young and hungry on the mixtape circuit, while her newer, sugar pop-loving delegation will likely crave the quirkier verses – and cotton candy-colored wigs – of today's Minaj." Jocelyn Vena from MTV stated that "The song not only is pure pop perfection, but RedOne's influence is evident, thanks to its grinding Euro dance beats", adding that "It is certainly the perfect song for those who enjoyed shaking their groove thang to 'Super Bass'. The lighthearted, feel-good vibe of the song is perfect for casual Barbz to blast. It's hard not to see Britney Spears' influence on the rapper/singer when listening to the song, and given that the two toured together last year, Minaj may be trying to remind her pop fans that she has an ear for what they want." Entertainment Weekly gave a negative review, stating that it's "super clubby and contains almost no rapping, which continues Minaj's push into the complete opposite direction she should be heading."

Bill Lamb from About.com was mixed with his review, stating: "'Starships' is a solid outing for Nicki Minaj. However, the day-glo pop-rap success of 'Super Bass', emotional power of 'Fly', and experimentation of her Grammy Awards performance has left us expecting Nicki Minaj to push boundaries. 'Starships' feels a little bit like retreating into a musical pocket and trying a little too hard to insure another pop chart hit. The result is pleasurable but not particularly memorable." Bloggers for Billboard magazine, Andrew Hampp and Erika Ramirez, criticized the track for "...monstrous pop hooks that overshadow its throwaway lyrics", while stating that it is "the most polarizing single in Minaj's career to date". The pair also noticed that Minaj seemed to be exploring her "musical identity" through singing instead of focusing on her strengths. Slant stated that "Starships (along with 'Pound the Alarm', 'Whip It', and 'Automatic') are "retro-techno-pop earsores  indiscriminately arranged bits of LMFAO's 'Sexy and I Know It', Rihanna's 'We Found Love', and pretty much any recent Britney Spears or Katy Perry song you can name" adding that "For the chorus to her self-affirmation anthem, Minaj shouts 'Starships were meant to fly!', echoing Katy Perry's 'Baby, you're a firework!' for its uncomprehending intuition that if something is in the sky then it must also be inspiring."

Commercial performance
"Starships" debuted at number nine on the U.S. Billboard Hot 100, marking her second solo arrival in the top 10 after "Super Bass", which reached number three. The song peaked at number five, for four non-consecutive weeks, and has been certified six-times platinum in the US. In the week beginning July 13, 2012, "Starships" made history on the chart by having spent twenty-one consecutive weeks in the top ten from its debut week, surpassing the Black Eyed Peas' single "I Gotta Feeling", which had spent 20 weeks in the top 10 in 2009, but has been passed by Justin Bieber's "Love Yourself", then The Chainsmokers's "Closer" (2016–2017), which spent 32 weeks in the top 10. The song peaked at number two on the Hot Dance Club Songs chart and number three on Pop Songs. It managed to reach number 10 on Rap Songs and 85 on the Hot R&B/Hip-Hop Songs chart. As of December 2014, the song has sold 4.5 million copies in the United States.

In the United Kingdom, the song debuted at number 16. The song eventually peaked at number two in that country, missing out on the top spot with Gotye's "Somebody That I Used to Know" outselling Minaj by 20,000 copies. Despite this, the song made it Minaj's highest single at the time in that country (until "Bang Bang" topped the chart in 2014). It also ranked sixth among the most-played songs of 2012 in the UK. It was ranked the 7th best-selling song of 2012 in the UK for selling 864,000 copies as of 31 December, also becoming the best-selling song not to peak at number one. As of 16 June 2013, the song has spent 69 weeks in the charts. In Scotland, the song debuted at number 11. Successfully, the song managed to peak at number one for two consecutive weeks, becoming Minaj's second number one in that country following "Where Them Girls At". The song stayed in the chart for 29 non-consecutive weeks. In Ireland, the song debuted at number eight. Eventually, the song peaked at number two, before going on to spend 38 consecutive weeks in the top 40. As of July 14, 2016, "Starships" has passed the 1 million mark in the United Kingdom.

In the Oceanic regions, the song was a big success. In Australia, the song debuted at number 14, rising to number two, staying there for five consecutive weeks. The song resulted in being Minaj's highest single in that country,(until Super Freaky Girl topped the country’s chart) and was certified 6× platinum by the Australian Recording Industry Association (ARIA) with sales exceeding 420,000. In New Zealand, the song debuted at 12. The next week. it rose to four and peaked at number two. The song resulted in being Minaj's second highest-peaking and longest-charting single in that country and was certified 2× platinum certification by the Recording Industry Association of New Zealand (RIANZ) with sales exceeding 30,000. Just recently in New Zealand, the song made the top five for the top-selling singles of 2012, placed at four.

In the European regions, the song was a huge success as well. In France, the song debuted at 102, and rose to 47 the next week. The song eventually peaked at number five for three non-consecutive weeks. In Belgium (Flanders and Wallonia), the song peaked at number five and number seven and charted over 20 weeks in both regions. It was certified Gold by the Belgian Entertainment Association (BEA) with sales over 10,000. In Sweden, the song debuted at number 43 on the charts. The song peaked at three for two consecutive weeks and stayed in the charts for 29 weeks. The song was certified gold by the International Federation of the Phonographic Industry (IFPI Sweden) with shipments of 20,000. In Switzerland, the song debuted at 60 on the charts. It later rose to number five in its 12th week for two consecutive weeks. It was certified platinum by the International Federation of the Phonographic Industry (IFPI Switzerland) with sales exceeding 30,000. In the spring of 2012, "Starships" was the 21st most downloaded ringtone. "Starships" has reportedly sold 7.2 million copies worldwide.

Music video

Background
The "Starships" video was filmed on Kualoa Ranch, Oahu Island, Hawaii, and the opening scene is from the Nā Pali Coast on the island of Kauaʻi in Hawaii. It was a three-day shoot, beginning on March 13, 2012. The video was directed by Anthony Mandler with extensive post-VFX produced by Leah Harmony and executed by a team of artists at Culver City-based post production company KILT. In an interview with Capital FM, Minaj briefly commented on the video for "Starships", calling it "very, very saucy" and her "best one yet". The video premiered on April 26, 2012, on MTV.

Synopsis

The video opens with a starship flying towards an island after being summoned by its local tribesmen. The island locals slowly awake as the craft passes overhead. The starship then beams a pink bikini-clad electric green-haired Minaj down onto the beach and she begins to sing. She is presumably being worshiped as a goddess as she is carried away through the jungle by the island locals wearing a pale pink bikini with strands hanging off the bottom and short green hair, which is also worn during some kaleidoscope effects and in one scene of her on the beach singing. Minaj is then seen dancing in the mountains wearing a white, pink and black bodysuit behind a glass box while some of the male islanders run up to her. The scene then shifts towards the volcano top at nighttime where Minaj is sitting on top of the box with some of the locals dancing around her. In the final scene, a blonde-haired Minaj, wearing a white fringed strapless bikini splattered with paint, is partying with the islanders. Intercut scenes show Minaj singing with kaleidoscope effects on her in the second outfit and some more kaleidoscope effects in the same outfit but under blacklights. It ends with her singing the last line while looking directly into the camera.

Reception and contest
MTV's John Mitchell criticized the video's postponed release, finding it strange that the video for "Beez in the Trap", the album's third single, was released before that of "Starships". On May 28, 2012, a "Starships" video campaign was announced on Minaj's official website. It asked fans to record a video of themselves performing "Starships" by singing, dancing or with a musical instrument. Minaj then selected 5 winners, and the contest winners won tickets and passes to meet Minaj on her Pink Friday Tour. The song won the MTV Video Music Award for Best Female Video in September 2012. As of May 2020, the video has more than 400 million views on YouTube.

Live performances
On February 26, 2012, Minaj performed the single live for the first time along with "Moment 4 Life", "Turn Me On" and "Super Bass" at the 2012 NBA All-Star Game. Minaj also performed the single on the eleventh season of American Idol results show on March 29, 2012, and on Today on April 6. Minaj performed the song in a mash-up with "Right by My Side" at The Ellen DeGeneres Show on May 10, 2012. Minaj also performed the single on her Pink Friday Tour. The song was also the encore song of Minaj's Pink Friday: Reloaded Tour and The Pinkprint Tour. On May 30, 2015, Minaj also performed the song on the iHeartRadio Summer Pool Party 2015 in Las Vegas, along with other singles, such as "Super Bass" and "The Night Is Still Young". Minaj performed the song on her fourth concert tour, The Nicki Wrld Tour, in 2019.

Awards and nominations

Track listing

Digital download
 "Starships" – 3:30

German and UK CD single
 "Starships" – 3:30
 "Stupid Hoe" – 3:16

Credits and personnel
Recording
Recorded at Kinglet Studios, Stockholm, Sweden, and Conway Recording Studios, Hollywood, California, United States
Mixed at Conway Recording Studios

Personnel
 Nicki Minaj – vocals, songwriter
 RedOne – songwriter, producer, instruments
 Carl Falk – songwriter, producer, mixing, additional vocals, instruments, guitar
 Rami Yacoub – songwriter, producer, mixing, vocal editing, instruments
 Wayne Hector – songwriter, additional vocals
 Trevor Muzzy – recording, mixing, vocal editing
 Ariel Chobaz – recording
 Jon Sher – recording assistant
 Mohombi – additional vocals

Charts

Weekly charts

Year-end charts

Decade-end charts

Certifications

|-

Release history

See also
List of best-selling singles
List of best-selling singles in Australia
List of Billboard Hot 100 top 10 singles in 2012

References

Nicki Minaj songs
2012 singles
Cash Money Records singles
Eurodance songs
Music videos directed by Anthony Mandler
Number-one singles in Honduras
Number-one singles in Scotland
Song recordings produced by RedOne
Songs written by Carl Falk
Songs written by Nicki Minaj
Songs written by Rami Yacoub
Songs written by Wayne Hector
MTV Video Music Award for Best Female Video
Songs written by RedOne
Songs written by Bilal Hajji
2012 songs
Songs involved in plagiarism controversies
Songs about dancing
Songs about spaceflight
Pop-rap songs